Whispers in the Fog is the 153rd volume in the Nancy Drew Mystery Stories series. It was first published in April 2000 by Pocket Books.

Plot summary
Nancy, Bess, George, and Ned travel to California to stay with George's kayaking trainer, Katie Firestone. They discover that her whale-watching boat has been vandalized, endangering her business.  By land and sea, Nancy investigates the mysterious tiny town where Katie lives, though her curiosity puts her in danger.

Adaptation
The ninth installment in the Nancy Drew point-and-click adventure game series by Her Interactive, named Nancy Drew: Danger on Deception Island, is loosely based on the novel.

References

Nancy Drew books
2000 American novels
2000 children's books
Novels set in California
Novels adapted into video games
Pocket Books books